Francis L. K. Hsu (28 October 1909 Zhuanghe County, Liaoning, China 15 December 1999 Tiburon, California) was a China-born American anthropologist, one of the founders of psychological anthropology. He was president of the American Anthropological Association from 1977 to 1978.

Career
Hsu was born on October 28, 1909, in Zhuanghe, Liaoning, China. He entered Tianjin Nankai High School in 1923, graduated from the Department of Sociology at the University of Shanghai in 1933, entered the Graduate School of Fu Jen Catholic University in the same year, and later engaged in social work at Peking Union Medical College Hospital.

He obtained the Boxer Indemnity Scholarship (United Kingdom) in 1937 and went to London to study anthropology at the London School of Economics, where he studied under Bronisław Malinowski. He obtained a doctorate in 1941 and was invited by Fei Xiaotong to return to China. In 1943, he was invited by Ralph Linton to visit the United States and he has since stayed in the country as a teacher.

He served as a lecturer at Columbia University from 1944 to 1945. Acting Assistant Professor at Cornell University from 1945 to 1947. In 1947, he was hired as a formal assistant professor at Northwestern University. He was promoted to professor ten years later and served as the head of the anthropology department from 1957 to 1976 for two decades. In 1964, he went to Japan to serve as a visiting professor at Kyoto University and conducted a field survey.

Contributions
Hsu was among the founders of psychological anthropology. He has updated and renewed the methodology of cultural and personality research and expanded knowledge of large-scale civil society. His theory has influenced the development of Chinese psychology and the production of psychoculture. His research provides a non-Western perspective on the study of human behavior and is of great reference value to the research of behavioral science.

Retirement and death
Hsu retired from Northwestern in 1978 and was hired by the University of San Francisco as the director of the Cultural Research Center. He also served as a senior researcher at the East–West Center at the University of Hawaii. He retired again in 1982, but continued lectures and academic work.

He continued to write in 1986 in spite of a myocardial infarction, and then suffered another two strokes and had to stop academic research. In the end, he died in San Francisco on December 15, 1999, at the age of 91.

Recognition
The American Anthropological Association established the Francis L. K. Hsu Book Prize to commemorate his contribution.

The 62nd (1977-1978) President of the American Anthropological Association
Honorary Professor of Northwest University
Academician of the 12th (1978) Academia Sinica.
Deputy Editor of the Journal of Comparative Family Studies
Advisor of the International Journal of Social Psychiatry

Selected publications

Books

Articles and chapters

 . Presidential Address, American Anthropological Association, Los Angeles, 1978. Free access HERE

References and further reading

Notes

External links
 许烺光著作集

Members of Academia Sinica
Chinese anthropologists
University of Shanghai alumni
Catholic University of Peking alumni
Alumni of the London School of Economics
Northwestern University faculty
Cornell University faculty
Columbia University faculty
1909 births
1999 deaths
People from Zhuanghe
20th-century American anthropologists
Chinese emigrants to the United States